Beyarjomand (Beyārjomand, Bīārjmand, Bīārjomand, and Bīyārjomand; also known as Beyār) is a city in and capital of Beyarjomand District, Shahrud County, Semnan Province, Iran. At the 2006 census, its population was 2,246, in 706 families.

Climate
Biarjamand has a cold desert climate (BWk).

References

Populated places in Shahrud County

Cities in Semnan Province
Qumis (region)